FK Košice-Barca was a Slovak football club, based in Barca, a city part of Košice, Slovakia. The club was founded in 1926 and dissolved after merging with FK Košice (former Vyšné Opátske team) in June 2018.

References

Kosice-Barca
Sport in Košice
Association football clubs established in 1926
Association football clubs disestablished in 2018
1926 establishments in Slovakia